Brenden Margieson, also known as Margo, (born 3 July 1972) is a former Australian professional surfer, considered to be surfing's first well-paid freesurfer. In 1996, he won the first ever Nias Indonesian Pro and was voted in Australia's Surfing Life, two years in a row (1998 and 1999), as "Best free-surfer in the world".
Margo is often described as a stylish regular foot, smooth and powerful, which makes him an exciting surfer to watch. He remains one of Australian surfing's favourite sons.

Life and career

Margo was born on 3 July 1972 in Sydney and moved to Byron Bay when he was 5 years old. After following his father's (Rodney Margieson) footsteps as a keen surfer, Brenden came on the scene at age 18 when Billabong saw his potential, sponsoring and giving him the opportunity to follow his dreams.

His career was built exclusively travelling the world to remote locations for sponsor-paid visits, doing editorial photos for Australian and International surfing magazines. Margieson has featured many magazine covers from Tracks to Waves, Surfing Life, Surfer and Surfing just to name a few, also appeared in more than a dozen surfing videos, working side by side with Jack McCoy and Justin Gane.

In 2003, Justin Gane Productions launched Wanderjahr: The Margo Project, a documentary showcasing the life and journeys of Brenden 'Margo' Margieson. It is an insightful and intimate movie, showing why Margo altered the face of professional surfing by opening the doors and forging the way for future surfers, doing what he does best – "going surfing for the love of it", creating a healthy and happy living from the sport without competing.

Brenden had two kids from his first marriage. His older son, Micah Margieson (born 21 February 2001), is following the line of his father. Micah won the Australian Junior Title in 2018 and have been showing that the powerful manoeuvres are in his blood, adding his own signature to his surfing style.

Nowadays, Margo lives in the sunny Gold Coast with his partner Lorena Beatriz and can be found at the southern beaches for a occasional surf.

Filmography

References 

1972 births
Australian surfers
Living people
Sportsmen from New South Wales
People from Tweed Heads, New South Wales
Sportspeople from the Gold Coast, Queensland
Sportspeople from Sydney